Lisa Mangum is an American author and editor best known for her young adult romance trilogy beginning with The Hourglass Door. She has worked as an editor at Deseret Book since 1997, and became the editorial manager at Shadow Mountain in 2014. She has edited several anthologies for WordFire Press, as well as authoring several short fiction and nonfiction works.

She received Foreword Reviews INDIES awards for the first two novels in The Hourglass Door trilogy. She also won two Whitney Awards: one for her 2012 novel, After Hello, and one for outstanding achievement in 2019.

Biography 
Lisa Mangum attended the University of Utah, graduating with honors with a degree in English. During her five years in college, she also worked at Waldenbooks, a mall-based bookstore chain. Mangum cites the example of her mother, who was also a writer and editor, as an significant influence in her decision to become an editor.

She was hired as an assistant editor for Bookcraft after graduating. Deseret Book purchased Bookcraft in 1999, and she has worked for them ever since. During her time as an editor, she has worked with several bestselling authors, such as Brandon Mull, Ally Condie, and Jason F. Wright.

Mangum released her first book, a time travel and romance novel titled The Hourglass Door, in May 2009. It won the Foreword Reviews INDIES award in the Best Young Adult Fiction category. The Golden Spiral was released in May 2010 and won in the same category as Hourglass. The final book in the trilogy, The Forgotten Locket, came out in June 2011, and was nominated in the same category as the first two.

Her first short story, "Sold Out", was published in the charity anthology, The Gruff Variations, in March 2012. After Hello, a stand-alone young adult romance set in New York City, was released in September 2012. At the 2012 Whitney Awards, it won in the Best Young Adult General Novel category. Her first anthology, One Horn to Rule Them All, was released by WordFire Press in August 2014. She has edited several additional anthologies for WordFire since then. Mangum became the Editorial Manager at Shadow Mountain (a division of Deseret Book) in 2014.

She currently lives in Taylorsville, Utah with her husband, Tracy. She is also a member of the Church of Jesus Christ of Latter-day Saints.

Bibliography

The Hourglass Door trilogy
The Hourglass Door (May 2009, Shadow Mountain)
The Golden Spiral (May 2010, Shadow Mountain)
The Forgotten Locket (June 2011, Shadow Mountain)

Standalone novels
After Hello (September 2012, Shadow Mountain)

Anthologies
Mangum edited the following anthologies:
One Horn to Rule Them All (August 2014, WordFire Press)
A Game of Horns (September 2015, WordFire Press)
Dragon Writers (October 2016, WordFire Press)
Undercurrents (March 2018, WordFire Press)
X Marks the Spot (January 2020, WordFire Press)
Hold Your Fire (February 2021, WordFire Press)
Eat, Drink, and Be Wary (February 2022, WordFire Press)

Short fiction
"Sold Out" in The Gruff Variations: Writing for Charity Anthology, Vol. 1 edited by Eric James Stone (March 2012, Writing for Charity, ebook only)
"The Sirens' Song" in All Hallow's Eve Collection edited by Julie Ogborn, Lisa Shepherd, Jennie Stevens, and Cassidy Wadsworth (August 2015, Mirror Press)
"Power Surge" in Heroic: Tales of the Extraordinary edited by Blake Casselman (September 2015, Dan Farr Productions)

Nonfiction
Saving Stories, Hunting Themes, The Writing Business series
Writing Tips from 300 Episodes of Supernatural, Volume One, Seasons 1-8 (2019, Colored Paper Clips, no ISBN)
Writing Tips from 300 Episodes of Supernatural, Volume Two, Seasons 9-14 (2019, Colored Paper Clips, no ISBN)

Awards 
Mangum has received multiple awards and nominations for her works.

References

External links
 Internet Speculative Fiction Database

21st-century American non-fiction writers
American book editors
American fantasy writers
American information and reference writers
American Latter Day Saint writers
American literary editors
American paranormal romance writers
American romantic fiction novelists
American speculative fiction critics
American speculative fiction editors
American television critics
American women editors
Latter Day Saints from Utah
Living people
Managing editors
Women print editors
Women science fiction and fantasy writers
Women speculative fiction editors
Writers from Utah
Year of birth missing (living people)